Drinking Boys and Girls Choir (DBGC) is a three-piece punk band from Daegu, a conservative city in southeastern South Korea, currently consisting of band members Meena Bae (bass & vocals), Myeong-jin Kim (drums & vocals) and Junghoon Han (guitar & vocals). The band's name reflects their love of drinking, their youthful appearance, the fact all members participate in singing, and their gender inclusiveness.

They cite the Japanese bands Hi-Standard, Dustbox, and Judy and Mary as influences, as well as Korean bands Crying Nut, ...Whatever That Means, and Billy Carter.

History 
In 2007, Meena and Myeong-jin (MJ) got to know each other through the music scene while both were playing in bands. In 2009, they formed a girl punk band called Chicken and Mayo ABC and moved up to Seoul, but both eventually returned to Daegu.

DBGC officially formed in 2013 when MJ and Meena, who shared a rehearsal space, decided to form a band. Both drummers at the time, Meena switched to Bass and guitarist Bondu, who had recently finished his military service, answered their ad. They bonded over a shared love of drinking, skating and punk. Inspired by Daegu’s 90s-00s hardcore punk/indie-rock scene before it moved to Seoul, a topic band are very passionate about, vowing not to move to the capital, preferring to nurture a sustainable local scene.

In 2017, MJ suffered a serious motorbike accident, so the band took a hiatus while awaiting her recovery. When she was fit again, they DIY produced their 18 track debut album “Keep Drinking” released on Damnably/Electric Muse in 2019, followed by several international tours, including in the UK, supporting label mates Otoboke Beaver & Say Sue Me.

Bondu retired from the band following their UK tour and Myorori stepped in on guitar duties.

In February 2020 the band toured Europe with Otoboke Beaver, just ahead of the pandemic closing down the world. In this time, they wrote and recorded a new album as well as participating in several online editions of festivals. Myorori decided to leave the band after the album’s recording due to other career commitments and Junghoon Han stepped in as their new member on guitar.

The bands sophomore album “Marriage License” was released in May 2021 picking up favourable press in Spin, Paste, MTV, Bandcamp and radio from KEXP and Stromo’s show on CBC in Canada. Spin Magazine added Marriage License to their list of best punk albums of 2021, as well as Bandcamp listing it as one of their best albums of 2021 too.

As the Korean music scene opened up from the pandemic shutdown, DBGC worked on establishing a better gig circuit in Korea with DIY tours in Seoul, Busan and Daegu via a network of likeminded bands. They played M for Montreal, SXSWonline, Focus Wales online showcase festivals. DBGC also were part of a compilation album calling out misogyny in the Korean indie scene called “We, Do It Together“.

Shows and Festivals 

They have played the music showcase Zandari Festa in 2013, 2015, 2016, 2018, and 2019.

In 2013 they played at the Ulleungdo Dokdo Rock Festival, and in 2018 they played Big Day South festival in Busan.

They toured Indonesia in August 2018. During their first show, the police locked them inside the venue and made everyone sit on the floor while they lectured them on drug use. Later they found out someone had smoked marijuana and passed out, and the owner called the police thinking he was dead. Their third show was also shut down by police but they played a secret show later that night.

In October 2018, they were announced as one of the Korean bands to perform at Austin's South by Southwest in 2019.

The members all have day jobs and have to take vacation days to go on tour.

After SXSW2019 they joined the Golden week tour (Leicester, Manchester, Bristol, London, Glasgow, Leeds) with Otoboke Beaver, and Say Sue Me.

Participated The Great Escape 2019 festival (Brighton).

They were invited to perform at Naver Onstage in 2019.

In 2019, the band also played at two of South Korea's biggest live music festivals, the Busan International Rock Festival and the Incheon Pentaport Music Festival. They continued to play in their home country at another festival, MU:CON, in both 2019 and 2020.

In February 2020 the band toured Europe with Otoboke Beaver.

DBGC returned to Busan's Big Day South in 2021.

They played at MBC Radio in 2021, one of the leading South Korean television and radio networks.

DGBC played an exclusive live performance and were interviewed by Larry Mizell, Jr for KEXP at the start of 2022, making them the third Korean act ever to do a session on KEXP after Say Sue Me and Ak Dan Gwang Chil.

Members 
Current
Meena Bae - bass, vocals (2012–present)
 Myeong-jin Kim - drums, vocals (2012–present)
 Jung-hoon Han - guitar, vocals (2021–present)
Former
 Myorori - guitar, vocals (2019–2020)
 Bondu Seo - guitar, vocals (2012–2019)
 So-yeon Park - guitar, vocals (2012-2015)

Discography 
 We Are, (2015 / EP)
 Club Heavy 20th Anniversary Compilation (2016)
 Keep Drinking (2018 / 1st Full length)
 BIG NINE, Let's Go (2019 / Single)
 OK, Bye / Start Again (2020 / Double single)
 Linda Linda (2020 / Korean&Japanese ver. Double single /The Blue hearts cover)
 Marriage License (2021 / 2nd Full length)

References

External links 
 DBGC's Official Website
 DBGC on Bandcamp
DBGC on Spotify
DBGC on Apple Music

South Korean punk rock groups
South Korean indie rock groups
South Korean rock music groups
Musical groups established in 2012
2012 establishments in South Korea